Valente Mendoza Falcón (born 17 January 1997) is a Mexican sprinter. In 2019, he won the gold medal in the men's 400 metres at the 2019 Summer Universiade held in Naples, Italy. He also won the gold medal in the men's 4 × 400 metres relay event.

References 

Living people
1997 births
Place of birth missing (living people)
Mexican male sprinters
Universiade medalists in athletics (track and field)
Universiade gold medalists for Mexico
Medalists at the 2019 Summer Universiade
21st-century Mexican people